Kaesim-sa is a Korean Buddhist temple located in the Chilbosan Mountains, North Hamgyong Province, North Korea. Founded in 826 under the Palhae kingdom and restored in 1377 by the Koryo dynasty, the temple long served as a religious retreat. The temple serves as a repository for many important buddhist sculptures, paintings, and scriptures. The temple grounds also hold a 180 kg bronze bell dating from 1764  and a famed 200-year-old chestnut tree. It is one of National Treasures of North Korea. The temple comprises the following buildings:

 Taeung Hall (대웅전/)
 Kwanum Hall (관음전/)
 Simgom Hall (심검당/)
 Umhyang Shrine (음향각/)
 Sansin Shrine (산신각/
 Manse Pavilion (만세루/)

See also

National Treasures of North Korea
Korean Buddhism
Korean architecture

References

 http://www.vnctravel.nl/northkorea/?City_Guide:Chilbo-san:Chilbo_Mountains
 https://web.archive.org/web/20110609220516/http://www.kcna.co.jp/item/2007/200704/news04/11.htm
 http://www.kcckp.net/en/periodic/todaykorea/index.php?contents+3904+2008-12+116+26
 http://www.kcckp.net/ch/news/news_view.php?0+15905

Buildings and structures in North Hamgyong Province
Buddhist temples in North Korea
National Treasures of North Korea
Religious buildings and structures completed in 826